Luck of the Turf is a 1936 British comedy film directed by Randall Faye and starring Jack Melford, Moira Lynd, Wally Patch and Moore Marriott.

It was made at the Nettlefold Studios in Walton as a quota quickie for release by the Hollywood studio RKO Pictures.

Plot summary
The son of a shopkeeper likes to pick winners in horse races and gives tips to his friends.

Cast
 Jack Melford as Sid Smith
 Moira Lynd as Letty Jackson
 Wally Patch as Bill Harris
 Moore Marriott as Mr Jackson
 Sybil Grove as Mrs Jackson
 Tom Helmore as Lord Broadwater
 Peggy Novak as Masie

References

Bibliography
 Chibnall, Steve. Quota Quickies: The Birth of the British 'B' Film. British Film Institute, 2007.
 Low, Rachael. Filmmaking in 1930s Britain. George Allen & Unwin, 1985.
 Sutton, David R. A chorus of raspberries: British film comedy 1929-1939. University of Exeter Press, 2000.
 Wood, Linda. British Films, 1927-1939. British Film Institute, 1986.

External links
 

1936 films
1930s sports comedy films
British sports comedy films
Films set in England
Films shot at Nettlefold Studios
British horse racing films
British black-and-white films
1936 comedy films
1930s English-language films
1930s British films